Live is a 1974 album by British band Mott the Hoople recorded during their debut US performance at the Uris Theater (Gershwin) on Broadway in Manhattan, New York City, United States, with Queen as the opening act.  A remastered and expanded 30th Anniversary Edition was released by Sony BMG on the Columbia label (516051). The release of the album in its original form in 1974 coincided with the announcement of the band's demise and it was, therefore, their final release. It was a single disc album in its original format but the addition of thirteen extra tracks has seen it expand to a double CD package.

The original release peaked at No. 32 in the UK Albums Chart.

Track listing

Original LP
Side A (Broadway)
"All the Way from Memphis" (Hunter) – 5:05
"Sucker" (Hunter, Ralphs, Watts) – 6:06
"Rest in Peace" (Griffin, Hunter, Watts) – 5:57
"All the Young Dudes" (David Bowie) – 3:49
"Walkin' With A Mountain" (Hunter) – 5:02
Side B (Hammersmith)
"Sweet Angeline" (Hunter) – 7:03
"Rose" (Griffin, Hunter, Ralphs, Watts) – 4:46
"Jerkin' Crocus" / "One of the Boys" / "Rock & Roll Queen" / "Get Back" / "Whole Lotta Shakin' Goin On" / "Violence" (Sunny David, Hunter, John Lennon, Paul McCartney, Ralphs, Dave Williams) – 16:00

30th Anniversary Edition 2 CD set (2004)
CD 1 - Broadway
 Intro - "Jupiter" from The Planets (Holst) – 0:46
 "American Pie"/ "The Golden Age of Rock 'n' Roll" (McLean / Hunter) – 4:16
 "Sucker" (Hunter, Ralphs, Watts) – 5:59
 "Roll Away The Stone" / "Sweet Jane" (Hunter / Reed) – 3:52
 "Rest in Peace" (Griffin, Hunter, Watts) – 6:01
 "All The Way From Memphis" (Hunter) – 5:02
 "Born Late '58" (Watts) – 4:51
 "One of the Boys" (Hunter, Ralphs) – 5:32
 "Hymn for the Dudes" (Allen, Hunter) – 5:46
 "Marionette" (Hunter) – 5:04
 "Drivin' Sister" / "Crash Street Kidds" / "Violence" (Hunter, Ralphs) – 9:06
 "All The Young Dudes" (Bowie) – 3:49
 "Walking with a Mountain" (Hunter) – 4:54

CD 2 - Hammersmith
 Intro - "Jupiter" from The Planets (Holst) – 0:46
 "Drivin' Sister" (Hunter, Ralphs) – 3:51
 "Sucker" (Hunter, Ralphs, Watts) – 6:03
 "Sweet Jane" (Reed) – 5:10
 "Sweet Angeline" (Hunter) – 6:47
 "Rose" (Buffin, Hunter, Ralphs, Watts) – 4:42
 "Roll Away The Stone" (Hunter) – 3:31
 "All The Young Dudes" (Bowie) – 3:53
 "Jerkin' Crocus" / "One of the Boys" / "Rock 'n' Roll Queen" / "Get Back" / "Whole Lotta Shakin' Goin On" / "Violence" (David, Hunter, Lennon, McCartney, Ralphs, Williams) – 16.16
 "Walking with a Mountain" (Hunter) – 9:09

Personnel
Mott the Hoople
Ian Hunter – vocals, rhythm guitar,
Peter Overend Watts – bass guitar, vocals,
Dale "Buffin" Griffin – drums, vocals,
Ariel Bender – lead guitar, vocals,
Morgan Fisher – piano, vocals
with:
Blue Weaver - organ (U.S.)
Mick Bolton - organ (UK)
Stan Tippins - vocals on "All the Young Dudes"
Technical
Fred Heller - executive producer
Gary Klein - executive production supervision
Bill Price, Gary Edwards - engineer (Island mobile studio)
James Reeves - engineer (Record Plant mobile studio)
Alan "Pinball Wizard" Harris, Bill Price, Gary Edwards, Peter Swettenham, Peter Wilson, Sean Milligan, Steve Nye - remix engineer
Roslav Szaybo - sleeve design
Dagmar Krajnc - front cover photography

References

External links
Discogs.com

Mott the Hoople albums
1974 live albums
Columbia Records live albums
Albums recorded at the Hammersmith Apollo